Alice Rowland Musukwa is a Zambian businesswoman, model, and beauty pageant titleholder. In 2010, she won the Miss Universe Zambia competition and was the country's representative at the Miss Universe the same year. She is also the current pageant national director of Miss Universe Zambia and Miss Teen Zambia. She is also the first ever black model to have walked Pakistan fashion week.

References

Zambian beauty pageant winners
Miss Universe 2010 contestants
1987 births
Living people
Zambian models